Wright County is a county in the East Central part of the U.S. state of Minnesota. As of the 2020 census, the population was 141,337. Its county seat is Buffalo. The county was founded in 1855. Wright County is part of the Minneapolis-St. Paul-Bloomington, MN-WI Metropolitan Statistical Area. In terms of population, Wright County is the tenth-largest county in Minnesota and the second-fastest growing.

History
The county was established in 1855, and was named for New York politician Silas Wright. The first county seat was Monticello; in 1868 the county seat was changed to Buffalo. Most of the area's first settlers were of German and Swedish origin. The county's population in 1860 was 3,729; in 1875, it was 13,775.

The 1998 thriller A Simple Plan was set in Wright County, though it does not mention a specific town.

Geography

The terrain is undulating and contains numerous small lakes. The county is bounded on the northeast by the Mississippi River. Wright is one of 17 Minnesota savanna region counties with more savanna soils than either prairie or forest soils, and one of only two Minnesota counties where savanna soils make up more than 75% of the county area (the other is Hennepin County).

Major highways

  Interstate 94
  U.S. Highway 12
  U.S. Highway 52 (runs hidden with I-94)
  Minnesota State Highway 24
  Minnesota State Highway 25
  Minnesota State Highway 55
  Minnesota State Highway 101
  Minnesota State Highway 241

Adjacent counties
 Sherburne County - northeast
 Hennepin County - east
 Carver County - southeast
 McLeod County - southwest
 Meeker County - west
 Stearns County - northwest
 Anoka County - northeast

Demographics

2020 census

Note: the US Census treats Hispanic/Latino as an ethnic category. This table excludes Latinos from the racial categories and assigns them to a separate category. Hispanics/Latinos can be of any race.

2010
The ethnic makeup of the county, according to the 2010 United States census, was the following:
 95.04% White
 1.06% Black
 0.34% Native American
 1.19% Asian
 0.04% Native Hawaiian or Pacific Islander
 1.53% Two or more races
 0.81% Other races
 2.45% Hispanic or Latino (of any race)

2000
As of the 2000 census, there were 89,986 people, 31,465 households, and 23,913 families in the county. The racial makeup of the county was 97.85% White, 0.26% Black or African American, 0.28% Native American, 0.44% Asian, 0.01% Pacific Islander, 0.36% from other races, and 0.80% from two or more races. 1.10% of the population were Hispanic or Latino of any race. 42.3% were of German, 11.9% Norwegian, 7.4% Swedish and 6.6% Irish ancestry.

There were 31465 households, out of which 42.10% had children under the age of 18 living with them, 64.50% were married couples living together, 7.70% had a female householder with no husband present, and 24.00% were non-families. 18.80% of all households were made up of individuals, and 6.80% had someone living alone who was 65 years of age or older. The average household size was 2.83 and the average family size was 3.26.

The county population contained 31.10% under the age of 18, 7.60% from 18 to 24, 32.60% from 25 to 44, 19.90% from 45 to 64, and 8.80% over age 64. The median age was 33 years. For every 100 females there were 101.40 males. For every 100 females age 18 and over, there were 99.90 males.

The median income for a household in the county was $53,945, and the median income for a family was $60,940. Males had a median income of $40,630 versus $28,201 for females. The per capita income for the county was $21,844. About 3.60% of families and 4.70% of the population were below the poverty line, including 5.50% of those under age 18 and 7.40% of those age 65 or over.

Government and politics

Communities

Cities

 Albertville
 Annandale
 Buffalo (county seat)
 Clearwater
 Cokato
 Dayton
 Delano
 Hanover (Small portion in Hennepin County)
 Howard Lake
 Maple Lake
 Monticello
 Montrose
 Otsego
 Rockford (Partly in Hennepin County)
 South Haven
 St. Michael
 Waverly

Townships

 Albion
 Buffalo
 Chatham
 Clearwater
 Cokato
 Corinna
 Franklin
 French Lake
 Maple Lake
 Marysville
 Middleville
 Monticello
 Rockford
 Silver Creek
 Southside
 Stockholm
 Victor
 Woodland

Census-designated place
 Silver Creek

Other unincorporated communities

 Albion Center
 Albright
 Enfield
 French Lake
 Hasty
 Highland
 Knapp
 Oster
 Rassat
 Rice Lake
 Smith Lake
 Stockholm
 West Albion

Ghost town
 Dickinson

Largest cities in Wright County

See also
 National Register of Historic Places listings in Wright County, Minnesota

References

External links
 Wright County government’s website
 Wright County community website

 
Minneapolis–Saint Paul
Minnesota counties
Minnesota counties on the Mississippi River
1855 establishments in Minnesota Territory
Populated places established in 1855